Soba is a municipality located in the autonomous community of Cantabria, Spain.

References

Municipalities in Cantabria